Aniline Yellow is a yellow azo dye and an aromatic amine. It is a derivative of azobenzene. It has the appearance of an orange powder. 
Aniline Yellow was the first azo dye. it was first produced in 1861 by C. Mene. The second azo dye was Bismarck Brown in 1863. Aniline Yellow was commercialized in 1864 as the first commercial azo dye, a year after Aniline Black. It is manufactured from aniline.

Uses
Aniline Yellow is used in microscopy for vital staining, in pyrotechnics for yellow colored smokes, in yellow pigments and inks including inks for inkjet printers. It is also used in insecticides, lacquers, varnishes, waxes, oil stains, and styrene resins. It is also an intermediate in synthesis of other dyes, e.g. chrysoidine, indulines, Solid Yellow, and Acid Yellow.

Toxic oil syndrome
Aniline Yellow was initially implicated in the 1981 Spanish Toxic Oil Syndrome (TOS), although further study suggested the cause was likely contaminated tomatoes.

A Madrid-based company imported denaturated rapeseed oil, dyed by aniline yellow to mark it as unsuitable for human consumption, to be used as a fuel in steel mills. However, the company distilled the oil to remove the dye, and sold it as a much more valuable olive oil for cooking. The result was a rash of pneumonia-type illnesses, with a second stage with lesions, weight loss, paralysis, and muscle wasting. The net result was over 20,000 sick and 400 dead. The chemistry of the poisonous reaction is still subject of a debate.

References

Azo dyes
Vital stains
Solvent dyes
Anilines